A list of films produced in Hong Kong in 1980:

1980

References

External links
 IMDB list of Hong Kong films
 Hong Kong films of 1980 at HKcinemamagic.com
 1980 films at chinesemov.com

1980
Lists of 1980 films by country or language
1980 in Hong Kong